HD 9578 is a candidate wide binary star system located at a distance of approximately 183 light-years from the Sun in the southern constellation of Sculptor. The main star must be viewed with binoculars or a telescope, as its low apparent visual magnitude of 8.35 is too faint to be viewed with the naked eye. The system is drifting closer to the Sun with a radial velocity of −4 km/s.

The primary component is an ordinary G-type main-sequence star with a stellar classification of G1V. It is around five and a half billion years old, and is spinning with a projected rotational velocity of 2.4 km/s. The star has nearly the same mass as the Sun but with an 11% greater girth. It is radiating 1.4 times the luminosity of the Sun from its photosphere at an effective temperature of 5,798 K.

Designated component B, it is a red dwarf with a class of around M4 and has an estimated 0.21 times the mass of the Sun.

The discovery of a candidate extrasolar planetary companion was announced in a press release in October 2009, but although mentioned in one paper, it has not been published in a peer-reviewed journal, as noted by a 2017 study. Designated HD 9578 b, this object is thought to have at least 0.62 times the mass of Jupiter, and take  to orbit the primary, with an orbital semimajor axis of 1.27 AU.

References 

G-type main-sequence stars
M-type main-sequence stars
Hypothetical planetary systems
Binary stars

Sculptor (constellation)
Durchmusterung objects
009578
007240